This is a list of awards and nominations of Juhi Chawla, an Indian actress.

Filmfare Awards

IIFA Awards

Zee Cine Awards

Bollywood Movie Awards

Star Screen Awards

Sansui Awards

Apsara Awards

Honors

References

External links
 IIFA Awards and Nominations-2006
 2004 awards -rediff
 Juhi Chawla's Awards and Nominations from Bollywood Hungama
 BFJA Awards Official Listings

Lists of awards received by Indian actor